International University for Science and Technology (IUST) (IUST) is a private university established in 2005, located in the city of Ghabagheb in Daraa Governorate, Syria. The university has six faculties: dentistry, pharmacy, engineering and technology, information technology, business administration and finance, arts and sciences.the university has a liaison office at Damascus, Al Mazzeh Eastern villas.

History 
After the beginning of the Syrian civil war in 2011, the university headquarters moved temporarily in 2013 to Damascus city in Kiwan opposite Tishreen Park near Umayyad Square, and the university continued in Kiwan until 2019 when it returned to its original headquarters in Ghabagheb, Daraa.

Faculties
IUST includes six faculties:
Dentistry
Pharmacy
Engineering and Technology
Business and Finance
Information Technology
Arts and Sciences

Organisation 
IUST comprises the following six colleges that meet the needs and demands of the local Syrian community and the Arab and regional communities as well:

 College of Business and Finance
 College of Information Technology
 College of Engineering and Technology
 College of Dentistry
 College of Pharmacy
 College of Arts and Sciences

Co-operation agreements 
The University has signed several cooperation agreements with Arab and international universities, such as:
 University of Utah
 Brno University of Technology
 Montana State University
 University of Philadelphia - Jordan
 O. P. Jindal Global University - India
 University of Petra - Jordan 
 Damascus university.
 Al Hawash University

Rankings 
As of August 2022, the university ranked 425 at the Arab Level and 7251 internationally, according to Webometrics for ranking universities.

External links
 International University for Science and Technology - IUST website

Universities in Syria
Educational institutions established in 2005
2005 establishments in Syria